Didier Faivre-Pierret  (born 20 April 1965) is a French cyclist. He won the bronze Medal in Team Time Trial in the 1992 Summer Olympics.

References

1965 births
Living people
French male cyclists
Olympic bronze medalists for France
Cyclists at the 1992 Summer Olympics
Olympic cyclists of France
Olympic medalists in cycling
People from Pontarlier
Medalists at the 1992 Summer Olympics
Sportspeople from Doubs
Cyclists from Bourgogne-Franche-Comté